Zafar Mahal may refer to: 

 Zafar Mahal (Mehrauli), a summer palace built during the fading years of the Mughal era in Delhi
 Zafar Mahal in the Hayat Bakhsh Bagh (Red Fort), a garden in the Red Fort in Delhi